Pluska is a small settlement in the Municipality of Trebnje in eastern Slovenia. It lies west of Trebnje with the A2 motorway running across the settlement's territory. The area is part of the traditional region of Lower Carniola and is now included in the Southeast Slovenia Statistical Region.

References

External links
Pluska at Geopedia

Populated places in the Municipality of Trebnje